The Roman Catholic Diocese of Kroonstad is a diocese located in the city of Kroonstad in the Ecclesiastical province of Bloemfontein in South Africa. The last ordinary was Bishop Peter Holiday whose resignation due to health reasons was accepted on 12 December 2022.

History
 26 November 1923: Established as Apostolic Prefecture of Kroonstad from the Apostolic Vicariate of Kimberley in South Africa 
 8 April 1935: Promoted as Apostolic Vicariate of Kroonstad
 11 January 1951: Promoted as Diocese of Kroonstad

Special churches
The Cathedral is the St. Patrick's Cathedral in Kroonstad.
St.Paul's parish in Rammolutsi.

Leadership
 Prefects Apostolic of Kroonstad (Roman rite)
 Fr. Guglielmo Herting, C.S.Sp. (1923 – 1924)
 Fr. Léon Klerlein, C.S.Sp. (1924.03.24 – 1935.04.08 see below)
 Vicars Apostolic of Kroonstad (Roman rite)
 Bishop Léon Klerlein, C.S.Sp. (see above 1935.04.08 – 1948.02.12), appointed Vicar Apostolic of Bethlehem
 Bishop Gerard Marie Franciskus van Velsen, O.P. (1950.05.31 – 1951.01.11 see below)
 Bishops of Kroonstad (Roman rite)
 Bishop Gerard Marie Franciskus van Velsen, O.P. (see above 1951.01.11 – 1975.11.15)
 Bishop Johannes Ludgerus Bonaventure Brenninkmeijer, O.P. (1977.04.15 – 2003.07.02)
 Bishop Stephen Brislin (2006.10.17 – 2009.12.18), appointed Archbishop of Cape Town
 Bishop Peter Holiday (2011.04.01 - 2022.12.12)

See also
Roman Catholicism in South Africa

Sources
 GCatholic.org
 Catholic Hierarchy

Kroonstad
Christian organizations established in 1923
Roman Catholic dioceses and prelatures established in the 20th century
Moqhaka
Roman Catholic Ecclesiastical Province of Bloemfontein